The Chicago O'Hare UFO sighting occurred  on November 7, 2006, around 4:15 p.m. when 12 United Airlines employees and a few other witnesses outside O'Hare International Airport reported a sudden UFO sighting. The Federal Aviation Administration refused to investigate the matter because this UFO was not seen on radar, instead calling it a "weather phenomenon".

The sighting
At approximately 16:15 CST on November 7, 2006, federal authorities at Chicago O'Hare International Airport received a report that a group of twelve airport employees were witnessing a metallic, saucer-shaped craft hovering over Gate C-17.

The object was first spotted by a ramp employee who was pushing back United Airlines Flight 446, which was departing Chicago for Charlotte, North Carolina. The employee apprised Flight 446's crew of the object above their aircraft. The object was also witnessed by pilots, airline management and mechanics. No air traffic controllers saw the object, and it did not show up on radar. (Freedom of Information Act released transcript of Air Traffic Controller's phone reporting to FAA).

Witnesses described the object as completely silent,  in diameter and dark gray in color. Several independent witnesses outside of the airport also saw the object. One described a disc-shaped craft hovering over the airport, stating that it was "obviously not clouds." According to this witness, the object shot through the clouds at high velocity, leaving a clear blue hole in the cloud layer. The hole reportedly seemed to close itself shortly afterward.

According to the Chicago Tribune'''s Jon Hilkevitch, "The disc was visible for approximately five minutes and was seen by close to a dozen United Airlines employees, ranging from pilots to supervisors, who heard chatter on the radio and raced out to view it."

Reaction from the Federal Aviation Administration and United Airlines
Both United Airlines and the Federal Aviation Administration (FAA) initially denied that they had any information on the O'Hare UFO sighting until the newspaper Chicago Tribune, which was investigating the report, filed a Freedom of Information Act (FOIA) request. The FAA then ordered an internal review of air-traffic communications tapes to comply with the Chicago Tribune FOIA request which subsequently uncovered a call by the United supervisor to an FAA manager in the airport tower concerning the UFO sighting.

The FAA stance concludes that the sighting was caused by a "weather phenomenon" and that the agency would therefore not be investigating the incident. According to astronomer Mark Hammergren, weather conditions on the day of the sighting were right for a "hole-punch cloud", an unusual weather phenomenon.

UFO investigators have argued that the FAA's refusal to look into the incident contradicts the agency's mandate to investigate possible security breaches at American airports such as in this case; an object witnessed by numerous airport employees and officially reported by at least one of them, hovering in plain sight, over one of the busiest airports in the world. Some witnesses interviewed by the Chicago Tribune were apparently "upset" that federal officials declined to further investigate the matter.

NARCAP report
The National Aviation Reporting Center on Anomalous Phenomena (NARCAP) published a 155-page report on the sighting and has called for a government inquiry and improved energy-sensing technologies: "Anytime an airborne object can hover for several minutes over a busy airport but not be registered on radar or seen visually from the control tower, constitutes a potential threat to flight safety."

Media coverage
The Chicago O'Hare airport UFO story was picked up by various major mainstream media groups such as CNN, CBS, MSNBC, Fox News, Chicago Tribune, and NPR.

On February 11, 2009, The History Channel aired an episode of the television show UFO Hunters with the title "Aliens at the Airport" in which they reviewed the incident.

The incident is also featured in the television series Hangar 1: The UFO Files episode "Unfriendly Skies".

 In popular culture 
The film UFO refers to this incident, as does an episode of Boston Legal''.

See also
List of UFO sightings

References

External links
 National Aviation Reporting Center – 155 page report – July 2007
  

UFO sightings in the United States
Government responses to UFOs
O'Hare International Airport
O'Hare International Airport UFO sighting
O'Hare International Airport UFO sighting
O'Hare International Airport UFO sighting